Slam!TV is a youth music television channel that airs dance and pop music videos which can be requested by listeners through SMS. Radio station Slam!FM launched the channel on 1 February 2007. The channel is owned by Radiocorp. The channel broadcasts 24 hours a day. It airs across the Netherlands.

On 3 October 2016, it was announced that Talpa Media sold SLAM! and Slam!TV to Radiocorp.

Logos

See also
 Slam!

References

External links 
 Official Website

Television channels in the Netherlands
Television channels and stations established in 2007